M12 or M-12 or M.12 may refer to:

Automobiles 
 BMW M12, a turbo 1500 cc 10-cylinder turbocharged Formula One engine of the 1980s
 McLaren M12, a racing car for the Can-Am series
 Noble M12, a British sports car
 Vector M12, an automobile made by Vector Supercars

Aviation 
 Beriev Be-12, Soviet Naval Designation M-12, a Soviet amphibious aircraft
 Grigorovich M-12, an improved version of the Grigorovich M-11, a Russian single-seat fighter flying boat designed by Dmitry Pavlovich Grigorovich
 Macchi M.12, a flying boat bomber produced in small numbers in Italy in 1918
 Miles M.12 Mohawk, a 1930s British two-seat, tandem cabin monoplane

Military technology & weapons 
 Beretta M12, a sub-machine gun by Italian designer Beretta
 Doppelpistole M.12, a double-barrel submachine gun based on the Steyr M1912 semi-automatic pistol, developed by the Austrian firm Steyr Mannlicher 
 Krupp 10.5 cm Haubitze M.12, a German howitzer used by Romania in World War I
 M12 Gun Motor Carriage, an American self-propelled artillery model
 Winchester Model 1912, a shotgun
 Zastava M12 Black Spear, a 12.7mm caliber anti-materiel rifle developed by Zastava Arms

Roads 
 M-12 (Michigan highway), a former designation for part of U.S. Route 2
 M12 motorway, in County Armagh, Northern Ireland
 M12 motorway (Great Britain), a proposed but never built motorway in southern England
 M12 highway (Russia)
M12 (East London), a Metropolitan Route in East London, South Africa
M12 (Cape Town), a Metropolitan Route in Cape Town, South Africa
M12 (Pretoria), a Metropolitan Route in Pretoria, South Africa
M12 (Durban), a Metropolitan Route in Durban, South Africa
M12 (Bloemfontein), a Metropolitan Route in Bloemfontein, South Africa
M12 (Port Elizabeth), a Metropolitan Route in Port Elizabeth, South Africa
 M12 Road (Zambia)
 Highway M12 (Ukraine), connecting Lviv Oblast to Central Ukraine
 Western Sydney Airport Motorway, route number M12, a proposed motorway in western Sydney, Australia

Space 
 Messier 12, a globular cluster in the constellation Ophiuchus
 Progress M-12, a Russian unmanned cargo spacecraft launched in 1992 to resupply the Mir space station
 Progress M-12M, an unmanned Progress spacecraft that was lost in a launch failure in August 2011

Other 
 M12 (artist collective), a Colorado-based artist collective
 M12 (Istanbul Metro), a rail line under construction in Istanbul, Turkey
 M12 (New York City bus), a New York City Bus route in Manhattan
 M12 (venture capital), a venture capital subsidiary of Microsoft
 M12 bolt, a size of ISO metric screw thread
 M12 connector, a size of IEC metric screw sized electrical connector
 Mathieu group M12, in the mathematical field of group theory
 Magic 2012, the thirteenth core set in Magic: The Gathering
 S-mount (CCTV lens), a CCTV lens mount using a M12x0.5 thread
 M12, a difficulty grade in mixed climbing